BR5-49 is the self-titled debut studio album of the American country rock band BR5-49. The album was released in 1996 (see 1996 in country music) on the Arista Nashville label. Three singles were released from the album, all of which charted on the Billboard Hot Country Singles & Tracks (now Hot Country Songs) charts. "Cherokee Boogie", the first of these three, was the highest charting, reaching #44. Following it were "Even If It's Wrong" at #68 and "Little Ramona (Gone Hillbilly Nuts)" at #61.

The album contains several covers:
The aforementioned "Cherokee Boogie" was originally recorded by Moon Mullican.
"Honky Tonk Song", co-written and originally recorded by Mel Tillis, was also recorded by Webb Pierce.
"Crazy Arms" is a cover of a Ray Price song.
"I Ain't Never", written by Mel Tillis and Webb Pierce, was recorded first by Pierce and later by Tillis.
"Hickory Wind" is a cover of a song by The Byrds.

Track listing
"Even If It's Wrong" (Gary Bennett) – 3:16
"Cherokee Boogie" (Moon Mullican, Chief William Redbird) – 2:31
"Honky Tonk Song" (Buck Peddy, Mel Tillis) – 2:36
"Lifetime to Prove" (Chuck Mead) – 3:03
"Little Ramona (Gone Hillbilly Nuts)" (Mead) – 3:24
"Crazy Arms" (Ralph Mooney, Chuck Seals) – 2:50
"I Ain't Never" (Webb Pierce, Tillis) – 2:11
"Chains of This Town" (Mead) – 4:04
"Are You Gettin' Tired of Me" (Bennett) – 2:13
"Hickory Wind" (Bob Buchanan, Gram Parsons) – 4:15
"One Long Saturday Night" (Mead) – 3:12

Personnel
From BR5-49 liner notes.

BR5-49
Gary Bennett – lead vocals, background vocals, acoustic guitar
Don Harron – steel guitar, Dobro, fiddle, mandolin, acoustic guitar
"Smilin'" Jay McDowell – upright bass
Chuck Mead – lead vocals, background vocals, acoustic guitar, electric guitar
"Hawk" Shaw Wilson – background vocals, drums

Additional musician
 Mike Janas - acoustic guitar, six-string bass guitar, percussion

Technical
 Don Cobb - digital editing
 Mike Janas - production, recording
 John Kelton - mixing
 Jozef Nuyens - production
 Denny Purcell - mastering

Chart performance

References

1996 debut albums
BR549 albums
Arista Records albums